Leslie Sansone (born February 14, 1961) is an American fitness instructor from New Castle, Pennsylvania. Since her first video was published in 1980, she has released over a hundred DVDs and four books. Sansone heavily promotes  walking exercises, resulting in a business self-reported to be worth $200 million. Since the beginning of 2020 Sansone has not been seen in new videos or on social media, and while the Walk at Home label is still operating, questions asking where Leslie is and what is her current connection to the brand, have been left unanswered.

Early life and family 
Sansone was born on February 14, 1961, in New Castle, Pennsylvania. She briefly studied engineering at the University of Pittsburgh and Youngstown State University before dropping out to work full-time as a fitness instructor. Sansone has three children, the younger two of whom she had with Joseph Bullano, whom she married in 1994.

References

External links 
 
 

1961 births
20th-century American people
20th-century American women
21st-century American people
21st-century American women
American exercise instructors
American people of Italian descent
Living people
People from New Castle, Pennsylvania